The men's 4 × 200 metre freestyle relay event at the 2022 Mediterranean Games was held on 1 July 2022 at the Aquatic Center of the Olympic Complex in Bir El Djir.

Records 
Prior to this competition, the existing world and Mediterranean Games records were as follows:

Results 
The final was held at 19:17.

References 

Men's 4 x 200 metre freestyle relay